Parmelia encryptata is a species of corticolous (bark-dwelling), foliose lichen in the family Parmeliaceae. Found in the Iberian Peninsula, it was formally described as a new species in 2011 by  Ana Crespo, Pradeep Kumar Divakar, and Maria del Carmen Molina. It is cryptic species that is a member of the Parmelia sulcata species complex, and it is morphologically indistinguishable from that lichen. Molecular phylogenetic analysis, however, shows that it is a genetically unique species originating from a different lineage. Parmelia encryptata has been estimated to have diverged from the P. squarrosa complex about 5.4 million years ago.

References

encryptata
Lichen species
Lichens described in 2011
Lichens of Southwestern Europe
Taxa named by Ana Crespo
Taxa named by Pradeep Kumar Divakar